Pityrodia serrata is a species of flowering plant in the mint family Lamiaceae and is endemic to the northern part of the Northern Territory. It is an erect shrub with sharply-pointed, egg-shaped leaves with serrated edges, and off-white, bell-shaped flowers streaked with purple.

Description
The four stamens extend slightly beyond the end of the tube, and are more or less of equal lengths.

Taxonomy and naming
Pityrodia serrata was first formally described in 1979 by Ahmad Abid Munir from a specimen collected near the Nabarlek mining camp in 1973. The description was published in Journal of the Adelaide Botanic Gardens. The specific epithet (serrata) means "saw-edged".

Distribution
This pityrodia occurs in Arnhem Land in the northern part of the Northern Territory.

Conservation
Pityrodia serrata is classified as "near threatened" under the Territory Parks and Wildlife Conservation Act 2000.

References

serrata
Plants described in 1979
Flora of the Northern Territory